Cordillera de la Costa (Spanish coast range) may refer to the following mountain ranges:

 Chilean Coast Range
 Venezuelan Coastal Range

See also
 Coast Range (disambiguation)